Ana María Arias Pinto Bravo (born 24 July 1946) is a former professional tennis player from Chile.

Biography
Arias is originally from Argentina, which she represented when she started playing on tour in the 1960s.

She made the round of 16 at the 1970 French Open as a qualifier and was runner-up in the doubles at the 1971 Swedish Open, partnering Linda Tuero.

In the early 1970s she married Chilean tennis player Jaime Pinto Bravo and began competing for her husband's country, including in two Federation Cup ties in 1974.

Her three children are competitive squash players, who all won medals for Chile at the 2018 South American Games.

WTA Tour finals

Doubles (0–1)

References

External links
 
 
 

1946 births
Living people
Argentine female tennis players
Chilean female tennis players
Argentine emigrants to Chile
Naturalized citizens of Chile